FK Palić is a football club based in Palić, Serbia.

History
FK Palić was formed on June 10, 1954, by the initiative of former footballers Jožef Balaž, Deže Šefer, Vlada Đorđević, Janko Pejanović and Milorad Icić. During Yugoslav period its major achievements were the qualification to the Vojvodina League in 1977 and winning the Bačka League in the season 1983–84. Club presidents were Miloš Ćosić, Ilija Šakić, Janko Pejanović, Marko Krnjajski, Simo Vukša, Imre Biro, Petar Blagotić, Karlo Vitez, Nikola Radulović, Veso Avdalović and Petar Đorđević.

Coaches
Former coaches of FK Palić include Deže Demeter, Blaško Milunović, Ivan Bogešić, Ilija Vorgučin, Stipan Kopilović, Aleksandar Gaborović, Jožef Sabo Rac, Mihalj Bleskanj, Josip Zemko, Antun Čikić, Marinko Poljaković, Svetozar Mirolović, Miloš Zakić and Dejan Vrana.

Stadium

Janko Pejanović is a multi-use stadium in the town of Palić, near the city Subotica, in Serbia. It is currently used mostly for football matches and is the home ground of FK Palić since its foundation, in 1931. The stadium holds 500 people. Along the main one, it has another auxiliary football pitch where, beside trainings, it is used for other sports as well.

References

External links
 Club profile and squad at Srbijafudbal

Association football clubs established in 1954
Football clubs in Serbia
Football clubs in Vojvodina
1954 establishments in Serbia
Palić